The Jiao River is a river in Zhejiang Province, China. Its upper stretches are called Yong'an Brook (永安溪) and Ling River (灵江). It flows into the Taizhou Bay, Yueqing Bay and Sanmen Bay of the East China Sea at the Port of Taizhou, a natural seaport on the coast of the prefectural-level city of Taizhou.

References

Rivers of Zhejiang